Mottek is a surname. Notable people with the surname include:

Frank Mottek, American broadcast journalist
Hans Mottek (1910–1993), German economic historian

See also
Motter